Tokyo: A View of the City is a book by Donald Richie published in 1999. It is his description of Tokyo geographically and also describing his experiences over the decades of life he spent there.

References

External links
 Google Books page

Books about Tokyo
1999 non-fiction books